For the People is the debut album by American hip hop supergroup Boot Camp Clik. It was released on May 20, 1997 via Priority Records and re-released as Still For the People on April 24, 2007 via Duck Down Music. Recording sessions took place from September 1996 to March 1997 at D&D Studios and at Chung King Studios in New York. Production was handled by Mark "Boogie" Brown, Buckshot, Shawn J Period, Tony Touch, BJ Swan, Shaleek, EZ Elpee, Squia and Louieville Sluggah. The album peaked at number 15 on the Billboard 200 and number 4 on the Top R&B/Hip-Hop Albums chart.

Consisting of Buckshot, Cocoa Brovaz, Originoo Gunn Clappaz and Heltah Skeltah, the crew officially organized in 1994, with all eight members appearing on the song "Cession At Da Doghillee" from Smif-N-Wessun's Dah Shinin'. The album features a different sound than that heard on previous Camp-related releases, with the group abandoning their past production crew Da Beatminerz, instead recording with live instrumentation. The sound put off many fans, and the album received mediocre reviews and went on to sell just over 350,000 copies in the United States. The interludes on the album feature snippets from real phone calls received on their official phone line.

Track listing

Notes
 On the track 2 the Boot Camp Clik is credited as 'everyone & their mother'
 Track 13 is listed as bonus track and performed by The Fab 5

Sample credits
 Track 2 contains a sample from "Mt. Airy Groove" written by Curtis Harmon, James Keith Lloyd and Cedric A. Napoleon as recorded by Pieces Of A Dream
 Track 11 contains an interpolation of "Louie Louie" written by Richard Berry

Personnel
Boot Camp Clik (The Great 8)
Kenyatta "Buckshot" Blake – vocals (tracks: 2-4, 7, 14), additional vocals (track 11), producer (tracks: 3, 8, 13, 14), executive producer
Darrell "Steele" Yates, Jr. – vocals (tracks: 2-4, 7, 8, 13, 14), additional vocals (track 10), executive producer
Tekomin "Tek" Williams – vocals (tracks: 2-4, 9, 13), additional vocals (track 10)
Barret "Louieville Sluggah" Powell – vocals (tracks: 2, 4, 8, 11, 13), additional vocals (track 5), producer (track 11)
Jack "Starang Wondah" McNair – vocals (tracks: 2, 4, 8, 9, 13)
Dashawn "Top Dog" Yates – vocals (tracks: 2, 4, 10, 13)
Jahmal "Rock" Bush – vocals (tracks: 2, 4, 6, 8, 13), additional vocals (track 5)
Sean "Ruck" Price – vocals (tracks: 2, 4, 6, 13)

Guest performers

The Original K.I.M. – vocals (track 1)
LaVoice McGee – additional vocals (track 3)
Demetrio "Supreme" Muniz – vocals (tracks: 5, 8)
Louis "Lidu Rock" Johnson – vocals (track 5)
Wayne "Illa Noyz" Evans – vocals (tracks: 6, 8)
Mada Rocka – vocals (track 7)
Jacob "LS" Clarke – vocals (track 7)
Derwin "BJ Swan" Benoit – vocals (tracks: 8, 14), producer (track 4)
M.S. – vocals (track 9)
Antoine "Twanie Ranks" Cassidy – vocals (track 10)
Daniel "D. Real" Brown – vocals (track 12)
J. "El Sha" J. Smith – vocals (track 12)
A. "Lil' Knock" Nash – vocals (track 12)
F.L.O.W. – vocals (track 14)

Technical

Joseph "Tony Touch" Hernandez – producer (track 2)
Mark "Boogie" Brown – producer (tracks: 3, 4, 7, 8, 11, 13, 14)
Darryl "Shaleek" Pearson – producer (track 5)
Shawn M. Jones – producer (tracks: 6, 12)
Lamont "EZ Elpee" Porter – producer (track 9)
Squia – producer (track 10)
Drew "Dru-Ha" Friedman – executive producer
Leo "Swift" Morris – engineering (tracks: 2-5, 8, 11)
Kieran Walsh – engineering (tracks: 5-7, 9, 10, 12)
Joe Quinde – engineering (track 8)
Joseph M. Palmaccio – mastering

Charts

Weekly charts

Year-end charts

References

External links

1997 albums
O.G.C. albums
Sean Price albums
Heltah Skeltah albums
Boot Camp Clik albums
Duck Down Music albums
Priority Records albums
Buckshot (rapper) albums
Albums recorded at Chung King Studios